University Presbyterian Church may refer to:
University Presbyterian Church (Buffalo, New York), listed on the U.S. National Register of Historic Places.
University Presbyterian Church (Seattle, Washington), church in USA
University Presbyterian Church and Student Center, church in Madison, Wisconsin, USA